Thomas Jefferson Henley (June 18, 1808 – May 1, 1875) was a U.S. Representative from Indiana, father of Barclay Henley.

Born in Richmond, Indiana, Henley attended Indiana University at Bloomington.
He studied law.
He was admitted to the bar in 1828 and commenced practice in Richmond, Indiana.
He engaged in banking.
He served as member of the State house of representatives 1832-1842 and served as speaker in 1840.

Henley was elected as a Democrat to the Twenty-eighth, Twenty-ninth, and Thirtieth Congresses (March 4, 1843 – March 3, 1849).
He served as chairman of the Committee on Patents (Twenty-eighth and Twenty-ninth Congresses).
He moved to California in 1849 and engaged in banking in Sacramento.
He served as member of the first State house of representatives 1851-1853.
Superintendent of Indian affairs of California 1855-1858.
Postmaster of San Francisco 1860-1864.
He died in Mendocino County, California.
He was interred in Santa Rosa Cemetery, Santa Rosa, California.

References

External links
 

1810 births
1875 deaths
People from Richmond, Indiana
Speakers of the Indiana House of Representatives
Democratic Party members of the United States House of Representatives from Indiana
19th-century American politicians